The Batman (Original Motion Picture Soundtrack) is the film score to the film of the same name composed by Michael Giacchino. The soundtrack was released by WaterTower Music on February 25, 2022, a week ahead of the release of the film.

Background 
Director Matt Reeves announced that Michael Giacchino would be composing the score for The Batman in October 2019. Giacchino has frequently collaborated with Reeves; he previously scored for Cloverfield (2008), Let Me In (2010), Dawn of the Planet of the Apes (2014), and War for the Planet of the Apes (2017). Later that month, Giacchino said he had already finished writing the main theme for the film because he was so excited to do so; because this music was written much earlier in the production than is usual for a film, Giacchino and Reeves were able to use it in promotional materials. Giacchino said he felt total freedom to write the music that he wanted for the film, agreeing with Reeves that this was their vision of Batman similar to how different comic book and graphic novel authors and artists over the years had been able to create different takes on the character.

Giacchino completed the score in October 2021, and his main theme was released as a single on January 21, 2022. Giacchino's theme for the Riddler was released as a single on February 4, and his Catwoman theme was released as the third and final single on February 17. The full soundtrack album was released on February 25.

Track listing 
All music is composed by Michael Giacchino.

Additional music 
"Something in the Way" by Nirvana, which was used in the promotional material, is featured twice toward the beginning and ending of the film. "Ave Maria" by Franz Schubert, "Piano Concerto No. 5" by Ludwig van Beethoven, "Frisk" by Patrick Topping and Kevin Saunderson, "Tesla" by Corvad, "Hot 44" by Baauer, "Troop" and "Darkroom" by Peggy Gou, "Dido's Lament" by Henry Purcell, "Requiem" by Gabriel Fauré, "I Have But One Heart" by Al Martino, and "Volare" by Dean Martin are also featured in the film. "Ave Maria" is featured four times in the film, and was performed by the Tiffin Boys' Choir, who also performed "Dido's Lament". Paul Dano, who portrays the Riddler in the film, also later performs the song during Batman's interrogation with the Riddler. Swedish DJ and producer Alesso also produced a track for the film titled "Dark".

Charts

References 

2022 soundtrack albums
2020s film soundtrack albums
Batman film soundtracks
Michael Giacchino soundtracks
WaterTower Music soundtracks